Michael Marrone may refer to:
Mike Marrone, American heavyweight boxer
Michael Marrone (soccer), Australian association football defender